Marko Borkovic (born 24 February 2004) is an English footballer who plays as a winger for Ohio State Buckeyes.

Career
Borkovic made his debut for Derby County as a substitute in a 2–1 EFL Cup loss against Sheffield United on 24 August 2021.

On 2 May 2022, Borkovic joined Ohio State Buckeyes.

Career statistics

References

2004 births
Living people
English footballers
English people of Serbian descent
Association football wingers
Derby County F.C. players
English Football League players
Ohio State Buckeyes men's soccer players